Ronald Bellamy (born December 28, 1981) is an American football coach and former wide receiver, who is the current wide receivers coach for the Michigan Wolverines. He played college football at Michigan from 1999 to 2002. He was originally signed by the Miami Dolphins as an undrafted free agent in 2003, and played for the Dolphins in 2004.

Bellamy was also a member of the Scottish Claymores, Baltimore Ravens and Detroit Lions. He served as the head football coach at West Bloomfield High School in West Bloomfield, Michigan from 2010 to 2021. Bellamy led the West Bloomfield Lakers to a Division 1 State Championship on January 23, 2021 with a 41-0 win over Davison. He has since announced that he will be resigning his post at West Bloomfield High School to accept an job on the coaching staff for his alma mater, The University of Michigan.

Early years
Bellamy lettered in both football and track at Archbishop Shaw High School in Marrero, Louisiana.

College career
Bellamy attended the University of Michigan from 1999 to 2002, where he played wide receiver and majored in sport management communications. In his career, he had 67 receptions for 888 yards and nine touchdowns, including 46 receptions for 530 yards and five touchdowns as a senior. From 2000 to 2002, Bellamy started 25 out of 36 games played.

Professional career

Detroit Lions
Bellamy spent 2007 on the practice squad of the Detroit Lions in the National Football League. After the 2008 preseason, he was waived by the Lions during final cuts on August 30, 2008.

Coaching career
Bellamy was appointed varsity football coach at West Bloomfield High School, Michigan in January 2010. In 2021, Bellamy joined the coaching team at the University of Michigan.

References

External links
 

1981 births
Living people
American football wide receivers
Archbishop Shaw High School alumni
Detroit Lions players
Miami Dolphins players
Michigan Wolverines football coaches
Michigan Wolverines football players
Scottish Claymores players
High school football coaches in Michigan
Sportspeople from New Orleans
Coaches of American football from Louisiana
Players of American football from New Orleans
African-American coaches of American football
African-American players of American football
20th-century African-American people
21st-century African-American sportspeople